NGC 4469 is a nearly edge-on spiral galaxy located about 55 million light-years away in the constellation of Virgo. It is also classified as a LINER galaxy. NGC 4469 was discovered by astronomer William Herschel on April 15, 1784. It is a member of the Virgo Cluster.

Physical characteristics
NGC 4469 has an X or peanut-shaped bulge, betraying the presence of a bar which generates such structures. 
NGC 4469 may also have an axisymmetric structure.

Dust Lanes
NGC 4469 has dust lanes that cross the Earth's line of sight.

See also
 List of NGC objects (4001–5000)
 NGC 4013
 NGC 4710- a similar looking spiral galaxy in Coma Berenices

References

External links

Spiral galaxies
LINER galaxies
Virgo (constellation)
4469
41164
7622
Astronomical objects discovered in 1784
Virgo Cluster